Party Supplies are an American record production and songwriting team, composed of Justin Nealis and Sean Mahon. On August 27, 2013, Justin Nealis and Sean Mahon released their first album as a group, titled Tough Love, on Fool's Gold Records. Rolling Stone rated Tough Love as the 13th best dance album of 2013 and described the album as being "dance music for introverts."

References

 

Songwriters from New York (state)
American musical duos
Hip hop duos
Songwriting teams
Record production duos
American hip hop record producers
Musicians from New York City
Hip hop groups from New York City
East Coast hip hop groups
American electronic music groups
Record producers from New York (state)